Sports Plus Arena is a 1,200 seat multi-purpose arena in Evendale, Ohio, USA. The ice arena has two sheets of ice for ice hockey, figure skating, broomball, sled hockey and open skating. The arena also houses Shooters Bar and Grill, arcade games, two concessions, Northlands Pro Shop, a inflatable zone, roller hockey, 6 basketball courts used for basketball and volleyball, and a sports trainer.

The arena was the home of the Cincinnati Swords and Queen City Steam junior hockey team in the North American 3 Hockey League from 2007 to 2015. The team would change their name in 2015 to the Thunder and began playing out of the Cincinnati Gardens in the 2015–16 season.

External links
 Sports Plus Arena website

Indoor arenas in Ohio
Indoor ice hockey venues in the United States
Sports venues in Ohio
Buildings and structures in Hamilton County, Ohio